The Foton Sauvana is a mid-size SUV sold by the Chinese manufacturer Foton Motor in China. The Foton Sauvana debuted during the 2014 Guangzhou Auto Show in China.

History
On May 10, 2015, the Sauvana was launched in the Philippines as the Foton Toplander with a price range from PHP 998,000 and PHP 1,150,000.

On September 15, 2015, Foton reported that an evaluation was made on whether to market the Sauvana for South Africa. On September 30, 2015, Foton reported plans to market the Sauvana to North America.

On August 7, 2017, Foton returned to Australia with the Sauvana introduced as an entry model.

Design

The Sauvana, formerly known as the Foton U201 during the development phase, was also known as the Foton Toplander in some foreign markets, and was built as a body-on-frame SUV. Prices of the Foton Sauvana ranges from 135,300 yuan to 360,000 yuan in China.

Powertrain
Power of the Foton Sauvana comes from a Mitsubishi-sourced 2.4 liter four-cylinder 4G69 petrol engine with an output of 135 hp and 200 nm, mated to a five-speed manual transmission, a six-speed manual transmission, or a six-speed automatic transmission.

References

Foton Motor vehicles
2010s cars
Cars introduced in 2014
Mid-size sport utility vehicles
All-wheel-drive vehicles
Cars of China